François Djobi Bassolet (1933- 2 July 2001) was a Burkinabé journalist, historian, and cultural leader.

Bassolet was the first director of the Agence voltaïque de Presse (AVP) from 1978 to 1981, which was later renamed the "Agence d'Information du Burkina" (AIB). He was one of the founders of the Panafrican Film and Television Festival of Ouagadougou (FESPACO), and the author of the first major post-independence history of the nation.

Selected works
François D. Bassolet, Évolution de la Haute-Volta, de 1898 au 3 janvier 1966 (1968).

Sources
Paul Ladouceur. Review article, African Studies Review, Vol. 15, No. 3 (Dec., 1972), pp. 521–527
Quotidien le Pays N°2536 26 December 2001.

1933 births
2001 deaths
Burkinabé culture
Historians of Africa
Burkinabé journalists
Burkinabé writers
20th-century journalists
21st-century Burkinabé people